is a Japanese professional footballer who plays as an attacking midfielder or a winger for J.League club Júbilo Iwata.

Club career

Borussia Mönchengladbach
On 21 July 2011, Ōtsu was signed by Bundesliga side Borussia Mönchengladbach on a three-year contract. He made his league debut on 22 October 2011, coming on as a late substitute for Mike Hanke, in a 1–0 away defeat against 1899 Hoffenheim.

VVV-Venlo
After having lost prospect with Borussia Mönchengladbach, Ōtsu signed with Dutch Eredivisie side VVV-Venlo until the summer of 2014 on 31 August 2012. He was supposed to succeed his countryman Keisuke Honda who had impressed and made a transfer to AC Milan half a year earlier. However, on 15 December 2013, Ōtsu badly injured his achilles tendon. After a long rehabilitation, Ōtsu became fit again and VVV-Venlo extended his expiring contract until the summer of 2015.

Return to Kashiwa Reysol
On 13 December 2014, it was announced that Otsu would leave VVV-Venlo in the winter transfer window. He had signed a deal with his former team Kashiwa Reysol.

International career
On 2 July 2012, Japan U23 manager Takashi Sekizuka included Ōtsu in the Japan under-23s for the 2012 Summer Olympics. He made his debut in their opening match on 26 July 2012 against Spain at Hampden Park, Glasgow, where he scored the opening and winning goal. He then went on to score in both Japan's quarter-final and semi-final against Egypt and Mexico respectively.
On 31 January 2013, head coach Alberto Zaccheroni included Ōtsu in the Japan national team for a friendly against Latvia. On 6 February 2013, Ōtsu made his debut for the national team, replacing Shinji Okazaki in the 82nd minute.

Career statistics

Club

International

Scores and results list Japan U23's goal tally first, score column indicates score after each Ōtsu goal.

Honours
Kashiwa Reysol
J. League Division 2: 2010

References

External links
 
 
 Japan National Football Team Database
 
 
 Voetbal International profile 
  
 Yuki Otsu profile  at Yahoo! Japan 

Living people
1990 births
Association football people from Ibaraki Prefecture
Association football midfielders
Japanese footballers
Japan international footballers
J1 League players
J2 League players
Bundesliga players
Eredivisie players
Eerste Divisie players
Kashiwa Reysol players
Borussia Mönchengladbach players
VVV-Venlo players
Yokohama F. Marinos players
Júbilo Iwata players
Olympic footballers of Japan
Footballers at the 2012 Summer Olympics
Japanese expatriate footballers
Expatriate footballers in Germany
Japanese expatriate sportspeople in Germany
Expatriate footballers in the Netherlands
Japanese expatriate sportspeople in the Netherlands